Dolní Němčí (until 1925 Dolněmčí) is a municipality and village in Uherské Hradiště District in the Zlín Region of the Czech Republic. It has about 2,900 inhabitants.

Etymology
The name Němčí is probably derived from Němci (i.e. "Germans") and refers to the first settlers of the area. The adjective dolní means "lower".

Geography
It lies in the Vizovice Highlands.

History
The first written mention of Němčí is from 1261. The villages of Dolní Němčí and Horní Němčí were first distinguished in 1437.

Culture
Dolní Němčí lies in the cultural region of Moravian Slovakia. The municipality is known for the foklor group NK Dolněmčan, which was established in 1965.

Sights
The landmark of Dolní Němčí is the Church of Saints Philip and James. It was built in the neo-Gothic style in 1870–1873.

Twin towns – sister cities

Dolní Němčí is twinned with:
 Myjava, Slovakia

References

External links

Villages in Uherské Hradiště District
Moravian Slovakia